C. Seetaramulu is an Indian politician. As of 2014 he served as a Telangana State Secretariat member of the Communist Party of India (Marxist).

He served as a member of the Andhra Pradesh Legislative Council for several years. He was the floor leader of CPI(M) in the Legislative Council. For the February 2012-February 2013 session he attended all working days of the Legislative Council. His term ended on 29 March 2013. He had been elected to the Legislative Council under the MLA quota.

In 2014 he was named as the CPI(M) candidate in the Bhuvanagiri seat in the 2014 Indian general election.

References

Living people
Telugu politicians
Communist Party of India (Marxist) politicians from Telangana
Communist Party of India (Marxist) candidates in the 2014 Indian general election
Year of birth missing (living people)